John Yates (born 1860) was an English footballer who played for Stoke.

Career
Yates played for Stone Miners Welfare before joining Stoke in 1883. He played in the club's first competitive match in the FA Cup against Manchester in a 2–1 defeat. He was released at the end of the 1883–84 season by manager Walter Cox. He later played for Sandbach Rangers.

Career statistics

References

English footballers
Stoke City F.C. players
1860 births
Year of death missing
Association football forwards